The Story of Ruth is a 1960 American historical romance film directed by Henry Koster, shot in CinemaScope and DeLuxe Color, and released by 20th Century Fox. The screenplay, written by Norman Corwin, is an adaptation of the biblical Book of Ruth. The film stars Stuart Whitman as Boaz, Tom Tryon as Mahlon, Peggy Wood as Naomi, Viveca Lindfors as Eleilat, Jeff Morrow as Tob, and introduces 19-year old  Elana Eden as Ruth.

Plot
The first part of the film revolves around Ruth, visualized as a pagan idolatress in her youth who serves as the spiritual teacher of a young Moabite girl, Tebah, who is being prepared to be sacrificed to Chemosh, a Moabite deity. Unhappy with the ritual crown created for Tebah, high-priestess Eleilat, along with Ruth, instruct Mahlon, the Judean artisan, to revamp the crown with jewels and glitter. Mahlon delivers the crown to Ruth at the temple, and he begins to question her about the existence of Chemosh. Ruth becomes doubtful of her religion and ultimately falls in love with Mahlon, sharing an interest in monotheism.

The non-biblical part ends with the sight of the Moabite girl being sacrificed, from which a distressed Ruth flees. The Moabites condemn Mahlon, his father Elimelech, and brother Chilion.  Chilion and Elimelech die in the prison, while Mahlon's punishment is to work at the quarries for the rest of his life.  Ruth comes to free Mahlon, but he is wounded as he flees the quarry.  He marries Ruth in a cave soon afterwards, and promptly dies.

The biblical storyline begins as Naomi (who was married to Elimelech), Orpah (who was married to Chilion), and Ruth are widowed. The second part is based more on the Book of Ruth, although a subplot is added, that of the Bethlehemites' initial disapproval of Ruth's pagan past and Naomi's closest kinsman rejecting Ruth as his wife.  As the next of kin after him, Boaz successfully obtains Ruth's hand in marriage.  As the film concludes, the final verses of the Book of Ruth are quoted.

Cast

 Elana Eden as Ruth
 Stuart Whitman as Boaz
 Tom Tryon as Mahlon
 Peggy Wood as Naomi
 Viveca Lindfors as Eleilat
 Jeff Morrow as Tob
 Thayer David as Hedak
 Les Tremayne as Elimelech
 Eduard Franz as Jehoam
 Leo Fuchs as Sochin
 Lili Valenty as Kera
 John Gabriel as Chilion
 Ziva Rodann as Orpah
 Basil Ruysdael as Shammah
 John Banner as King of Moab
 Adelina Pedroza as Iduma
 Daphna Einhorn as Tebah	
 Sara Taft as Eska
 Jean Inness as Hagah
 Berry Kroeger as Huphim
 Jon Silo as Tacher
 Don Diamond as Yomar

Production
In 1957, Simon Windelburg was announced as the film's screenwriter. Michael Kanin and his wife, Fay Kanin, who were later hired to write the screenplay, wrote treatments for the film. Frank G. Slaughter wrote a screenplay based on his 1954 novel The Song of Ruth: A Love Story From the Old Testament. Norman Corwin wrote an entirely new screenplay after summer 1958. Corwin submitted his final draft of the script on September 1, 1959. Production began in late November 1959 and ended in mid-February 1960.

Casting
Susan Strasberg, a contender for the role Ruth, was tested in September 1959. Other actresses who tested for the role were Susan Kohner, Tina Louise, Diane Baker, and Millie Perkins. Israeli actress Elana Cooper and Swedish actress Ulla Jacobsson arrived in Los Angeles in September 1959 to test for the role. Myrna Fahey, who had recently signed a contract with 20th-Century Fox, was also tested. In October 1959, Cooper was cast as Ruth, changed her name from "Elana Cooper" to "Elana Eden," and signed a "term pact" with the studio.

Stephen Boyd was first cast as Boaz but later turned down the role and said: "I think the picture would be much better without me." Boyd later played Nimrod in John Huston's The Bible: In the Beginning... (1966), another biblical epic released by 20th-Century Fox. Stuart Whitman replaced Boyd as Boaz in December 1959.

Helen Hayes and Irene Dunne were offered the role of Naomi before Peggy Wood was cast.

Release
On June 17, 1960, The Story of Ruth premiered at the Paramount Theatre in New York City  and on June 30, 1960, in Beverly Hills at the Fox Wilshire Theatre.

Home media
In 2006, 20th Century Fox Home Entertainment released The Story of Ruth on DVD with special features, including a preview, a trailer, and several Movietone News shorts concerning the film.

In 2013, the DVD was re-released with new cover art but the same features as the 2006 release.

Critical response

The Story of Ruth received favorable reviews upon release. Variety called it "a refreshingly sincere and restrained Biblical drama, a picture that elaborates on the romantic, political and devotional difficulties encountered by the Old Testament heroine".

Daniel A. Poling, editor of the Christian Herald, described the film as "[g]loriously cast and faultlessly directed".

Time considered the film "commendably unepic".

Carl Lane, writing for the Evening Independent, praised Elana Eden's performance: "...a flesh and blood Ruth of passion and compassion, of tenderness and dignity, a woman of whom the viewer tells himself on leaving the theater: 'This is Ruth as she must have been. She could have been no other.'"

Poling believed Eden's portrayal of Ruth was "worthy of an Oscar", and Variety described it as "a performance of dignity", as she projects "an inner strength through a delicate veneer".

Peggy Wood's performance also received high commendation from critics. Variety noticed her "excellent characterization of Naomi" and acknowledged that her "timing is always sharp". Lane thought she: "..creates an unforgettable character. Patience, faith, wisdom, all mature within her as the story progresses."

Of both performances, Boxoffice wrote: "This personal and human tale benefits by the realistic portrayals of the beautiful Israeli actress Miss Eden and the mature Miss Wood, who play together with touching affinity."

Awards
The Story of Ruth won:
 The Hollywood Foreign Press Association's Best Picture of the Month Award for July 1960. The bronze plaque was scheduled to be presented to producer Samuel G. Engel at the Greater Los Angeles Press Club on July 27, with director Henry Koster and stars Elana Eden and Tom Tryon also present.
 The Parents' Magazine Family Award Medal for July 1960. The award was described by Movietone News as "one of the most sought-after accolades that can be awarded to film drama". Elana Eden and 20th Century Fox president Spyros Skouras attended the award presentation, which was filmed by Movietone News.

Cultural references 
The story was adapted as a comic book, "Dell Four Color #1144 (September 1960)".

In Guillermo del Toro's Oscar-winning fantasy drama The Shape Of Water (2017), the Amphibian Man, spellbound, watches The Story Of Ruth in a poorly attended cinema after having escaped from an apartment above.

References

External links

 
 
 
 
 

1960 films
Films scored by Franz Waxman
Book of Ruth
Films based on the Hebrew Bible
Films directed by Henry Koster
1960 drama films
1960s historical romance films
20th Century Fox films
CinemaScope films
Films adapted into comics
1960s English-language films
American historical romance films
American historical drama films
1960s American films